Canadian Manufacturers and Exporters (formerly known as the Canadian Manufacturers' Association) is a Canadian trade association which represents manufacturers and exporters. It was established by an act of Parliament in 1871. Its head office is in Toronto.

It was formed from a 1996 merger of the Canadian Manufacturers Association (CMA) and the Canadian Exporters Association (CEA). CEA had formed in 1943.

Notable people
 Carl Pollock, president
 George Provost, general manager of the Manitoba division

References

 
1871 establishments in Canada
Trade associations based in Canada
Manufacturing trade associations
Organizations based in Toronto